Elyssa Davalos (born May 30, 1959, in Canoga Park, Los Angeles, California) is a former American television and movie actress. Her father was actor Richard Davalos and her sister is musician Dominique Davalos. She is the mother of actress Alexa Davalos, from her marriage to photographer Jeff Dunas. She is of Spanish and Finnish descent on her father's side.

Filmography

Film

Television

References

External links
 

1959 births
American film actresses
American television actresses
Living people
20th-century American actresses
American people of Spanish descent
American people of Finnish descent
21st-century American women